Galicia may refer to:

Geographic regions
 Galicia (Spain), a region and autonomous community of northwestern Spain
 Gallaecia, a Roman province
 The post-Roman Kingdom of the Suebi, also called the Kingdom of Gallaecia
 The medieval Kingdom of Galicia
 The Republic of Galicia, which only lasted for a few hours on 27 June 1931
 Galicia (Eastern Europe), a historical region in southeastern Poland and western Ukraine
 The Kingdom of Galicia–Volhynia or Kingdom of Rus, a medieval kingdom
 The Kingdom of Galicia and Lodomeria, a crown land of the Austrian Empire and later the Austrian half (Cisleithania) of Austria-Hungary
 West Galicia or New Galicia, a short-lived administrative region of the Austrian Empire, eventually merged into the Kingdom of Galicia and Lodomeria
 The District of Galicia, part of the Nazi General Government during the World War II occupation of Poland

Named after Spanish Galicia
 Galicia, Aklan, a barangay in Panay, Philippines
 Nueva Galicia, a region of New Spain, now in Mexico
 Nueva Galicia, an old name applied to the Chiloé Archipelago in southern Chile

Ships
 Spanish ship Galicia (1750), Spanish third-rate ship of the line
 Galicia-class landing platform dock, a ship class of the Spanish Navy
 Spanish ship Galicia (L51), lead ship of the above class
 Spanish landing ship Galicia (L31), formerly USS San Marcos, bought in 1974 by the Spanish Navy

Sports
 Deportivo Galicia, a Venezuelan football club
 Galícia Esporte Clube, a Brazilian football club
 Galicia national football team, a Spanish team
 Galicja national football team, a Polish team

Other uses
 Galicia (crustacean), a fossil in family Erymidae

See also
 Galatia (disambiguation)
 Galich (disambiguation)
 Galician (disambiguation)
 Galizia, a surname